Rahmatullah Tuhin  is a Bangladeshi producer, screenwriter, and director. He gets best Director of TV drama award from RTV Star award 2011 & Peace Film Festival Award 2019 for The Brand New Friendship  & 4th Sylhet Film Festival Award for the film Light Years Away.

Early life and education 

Rahmatullah Tuhin was born in Barisal on 2 January 1970. His father Mohd. Nurul Anam was a poet and a mid-level career professional of Bangladesh government. His mother Hasina Morsheda is a small entrepreneur of boutique products. He has three brothers and two sisters. At his early age, Rahmatuallh Tuhin fought against poverty and earned money as a private tutor to bear his educational expenses. He went through the real life experience of poor and repressed people of the society that made him a true director/screenwriter, producer in his professional life.

In 1993, Rahmatullah Tuhin completed his Master of Arts in psychology from the Jagannath University, Dhaka, Bangladesh.

Rahmatullah Tuhin was the member of Bangladesh Shishu Academy, Dhaka Little Theatre (Theatre Group for Children), and Kendrio Kochi Kachar Mela . In 1989, Rahmatullah Tuhin started performing on stage with THEATRE (one of the Dhaka's oldest performing stage drama group).  He was also executive committee member of the Theatre group. He is still an active member of this theatre group.

Career
Rahmatuallh Tuhin started his professional career as making television and radio programs, directing TV dramas, documentaries and feature films, making TV commercials, and management of commercial and trade events. Before beginning work as an independent director, Rahmatullah Tuhin has garnered working experience as a chief assistant director and co-director in several TV dramas, documentaries, and TV commercials. As a co-director, he was involved in making the feature film titled Lal Tip which was jointly produced by the Impress Telefilm Limited and a notable film producing house from France.

Filmography

Natok

Films

Awards

Nominations

References

External links
 

1970 births
Bangladeshi film directors
Bangladeshi film producers
People from Dhaka
Living people